The Secret Chord (2015) is a novel about King David by Pulitzer Prize-winning author Geraldine Brooks.

Plot summary 
Told from the point of view of the prophet Nathan, this book follows the life of biblical King David.

Factual background 
The title is taken from the Leonard Cohen song Hallelujah.

Critical reception 
A reviewer in the Harvard Crimson described Brooks's use of historical material as "spectacularly accessible."

References

Novels based on the Bible
Australian historical novels
Novels set in ancient Israel
2015 Australian novels
Cultural depictions of David
Viking Press books